Suburban Voice is a punk zine published by Al Quint. Started in 1982, it was originally titled Suburban Punk for the first 10 issues. Although the zine has other contributors, Quint is its primary writer. The zine is noted for its in-depth interviews and detailed music reviews. The print version ended with issue #46, in 2003. Since then, it has been an online blog.

References

External links
 Suburban Voice (official blog).
 Suburban Voice fanzine and blog

1982 establishments in Massachusetts
2003 disestablishments in Massachusetts
Online music magazines published in the United States
Defunct magazines published in the United States
Magazines established in 1982
Magazines disestablished in 2003
Magazines published in Massachusetts
Online magazines with defunct print editions
Punk zines